Sarajevo Blues is a book of poetry first published in 1992 during the siege of Sarajevo by Semezdin Mehmedinović.  Mr. Mehmedinović's book was translated into English by Ammiel Alcalay in 1998.  Mehmedinović's text was translated into music by Jewlia Eisenberg in 2004.

The Book of Poetry by Semezdin Mehmedinović 
In Sarajevo Blues, Semezdin  Mehmedinović tells the story of a city under siege.  The poet lived in the city and tells the story of resistance to nationalistic fervor. This book was part of the Biblioteka series, which gave a forum to Bosnian writers who were either living under siege like Mehmedinović or living in exile.  The Washington Post described the book of poetry as "widely considered here to be the best piece of writing to emerge from this besieged capital since Bosnia's war erupted".

The CD by Charming Hostess 
In the Charming Hostess CD Jewlia Eisenberg continues her tradition of arranging music and text from the Jewish, African, and Bosnian Diasporas.  This time setting the text of Mehmedinović, Charming Hostess sings of genocide and nationalism, freedom under siege, the nature of evil, and resisting war by any means necessary. The work explores Mr. Mehmedinović's text through a lens that includes Jewish, Balkan and Sufi musical influences.

External links
English edition of the book
German edition of the book
Charming Hostess / Sarajevo Blues

1992 poetry books
Poetry collections
Postmodern novels
Siege of Sarajevo